"Everybody Loves a Clown" is a song written by Snuff Garrett, Gary Lewis, and Leon Russell and was recorded by Gary Lewis & the Playboys for their 1965 album, Everybody Loves a Clown. The song reached No. 4 on the Billboard Hot 100 in 1965.

Personnel

According to the AFM contract sheet, the following musicians appeared at the recording session.

Leon Russell - session leader
Hal Blaine
Snuff Garrett
Gary Lewis
Carl Radle
David H. Costell
John R. West
David Walker

Cover versions
Jan and Dean on their 1966 album, Filet of Soul
Del Shannon

In popular culture
The song was featured in The Simpsons episode "Treehouse of Horror III."

References

1965 singles
1965 songs
Gary Lewis & the Playboys songs
Liberty Records singles
Songs written by Leon Russell
Songs written by Snuff Garrett